Maluma (born 1994) is a Colombian reggaeton singer.

Maluma may also refer to:
Maluma (avocado), a commercial cultivar of avocado
Maluma, a test word of the bouba/kiki effect

People with the surname
Alfred Leonhard Maluma (1955–2021), Tanzanian Roman Catholic bishop
Larry Maluma, Zambian-Australian reggae artist

See also
Malouma